Oxymeris areolata, common name : the dark-spotted auger, is a species of sea snail, a marine gastropod mollusc in the family Terebridae, the auger snails.

Description
The shell size varies between 65 mm and 182 mm.

Distribution
This species is distributed in the Red Sea, in the Indian Ocean along Durban, South Africa, and in the Pacific Ocean along Hawaii.

References

 Bratcher T. & Cernohorsky W.O. (1987). Living terebras of the world. A monograph of the recent Terebridae of the world. American Malacologists, Melbourne, Florida & Burlington, Massachusetts. 240pp
 Terryn Y. (2007). Terebridae: A Collectors Guide. Conchbooks & NaturalArt. 59pp + plates

External links
 

Terebridae
Gastropods described in 1807